S-56 was a Stalinets-class submarine of the Soviet Navy. She was laid down by shipyard #194 in Leningrad on 24 November 1936, shipped in sections by rail to Vladivostok where it was reassembled by Dalzavod. She was launched on 25 December 1939 and commissioned on 20 October 1941 in the Pacific Fleet.
During World War II, the submarine was under the command of Captain Grigori Shchedrin and was moved from the Pacific Fleet to the Northern fleet across the Pacific and Atlantic Oceans via the Panama Canal.
After decommissioning, the submarine was turned into a museum ship.

Service history
For her service, the submarine was awarded with the Order of the Red Banner and the Guards badge.

During the attack against Eurostadt, another torpedo hit and damaged the German freighter Wartheland (3676 GRT) but the ship was saved because the torpedo was a dud.

References 

Soviet S-class submarines
Ships built in the Soviet Union
1939 ships
World War II submarines of the Soviet Union
Museum ships in Russia
Cultural heritage monuments of regional significance in Primorsky Krai